Xen Coffee is an independent siphon coffee bar in Hong Kong. Xen Coffee's first coffee shop was in Quarry Bay. Xen Coffee serves highly selective coffee varieties from Africa, Indonesia, Central and South Americas. Xen Coffee was awarded Best Fair Trade Cafe in Hong Kong for its effort as a pioneer in promoting Fair Trade products like chocolate from Ghana, organic coffee from Ethiopian Yirgacheffe and the rainforest of Guatemala in Hong Kong. Time Out magazine (Hong Kong edition) has selected Xen Coffee as one of Hong Kong's 20 Best Coffee Spots. Xen Coffee has also been covered in My Coffee Guide written by Moses Chan, a coffee geek and celebrity in Hong Kong. Helen Chow, the head Siphonist of Xen Coffee was awarded the title of World Siphonist by the Specialty Coffee Association of Japan (SCAJ) to honor her achievement as second runner-up in the World Siphonist Championship (WSC) 2010. The founder of Xen Coffee, Dixon Ip, is the first person in China to obtain certifications from both the Specialty Coffee Association of America (SCAA) and Coffee Quality Institute (CQI) as SCAA Cupping Judge and CQI Licensed Q Grader. Xen Coffee focuses on educating the local community on coffee beyond espresso and promoting the concept of enjoying specialty coffee from single origins.

Siphon coffee history in Hong Kong
Hong Kong is a unique city in China. Due to the strong influence of British colonists, Hong Kong has a unique mixed Chinese-Western culture. After British rule for more than 150 years, tea has been a more common beverage than coffee during the 1960s to 1980s. Thanks to the opening of Pacific Coffee Company, the first Seattle coffee house in 1992, coffee became a very popular drink in Hong Kong. Hong Kong people were then exposed to all kinds of European-style coffee such as espresso and latte. In Hong Kong, the very first appearance of a siphon coffee maker was in the 1970s, at a coffee shop (which may also be the city's first bona-fide coffee shop) on Patterson Street, Causeway.

See also
 Siphon coffee
 UCC Ueshima Coffee Co.

Sources

General
品味速遞咖啡. UFood.com. 4 February 2009.
300秒等一口香醇咖啡. 新假期. 2 March 2009.
【生活著數台】. Asia Television 亞洲電視 本港台. 27 March 2009.
飲出咖啡新文化. 成報, p6. 22 May 2009.
Gourmet Goldmine. HK Magazine. 10–12 July 2009.
咖啡的輕和重. 明報周刊. 26 December 2009.
Green Coffee. 飲食男女. 5 February 2010.
虹吸式咖啡【生活加油站】. Asia Television 亞洲電視 本港台. 11 March 2010.
手調沖泡咖啡【生活加油站】. Asia Television 亞洲電視 本港台. 18 March 2010.
有机咖啡馆 (Part 1) (Part 2)【乐活时尚坊】. China Entertainment Television 华娱卫视. 18 March 2010.
Hong Kong coffee experts share their love of the brew. CNNGo. 15 April 2010.
簡單生活料理 – 有機咖啡【美食法庭】. i-CABLE 有線寬頻. 25 April 2010.
穏やかな香りに包まれて本格珈琲を. Pocket Page Weekly. 1 June 2010.
World Barista Championship Go Live Partners Asia/Pacific Region. World Barista Championship. June 2010.
Dixon Ip – Coffee Expert【Morning Brew】. Radio Television Hong Kong RTHK Radio 3. 28 July 2010.
Liquid highs in Hong Kong. CNNGo. 13 August 2010.

External links
 

Coffeehouses and cafés in China
Catering and food service companies of Hong Kong
Hong Kong brands
Restaurants established in 2008